The Tampa Bay Watershed is the  Florida area which drains to Tampa Bay on the Gulf of Mexico, including the area draining from Gasparilla Pass and the watershed of Hillsborough Bay.  The city of Tampa and the southern portion of the metropolitan Tampa Bay Area are within the watershed.

References

W
Watersheds of Florida
Drainage basins of the Gulf of Mexico